Beatriz Camuñas (born 26 or 27 March 1959) is a retired Mexican swimmer who competed in the 1976 Summer Olympics

References

External links

1959 births
Living people
Female breaststroke swimmers
Mexican female swimmers
Olympic swimmers of Mexico
Swimmers at the 1976 Summer Olympics
Central American and Caribbean Games gold medalists for Mexico
Central American and Caribbean Games medalists in swimming
Competitors at the 1974 Central American and Caribbean Games
20th-century Mexican women
21st-century Mexican women